Adam Cuthbertson (born 24 February 1985) is an Australian former professional rugby league footballer who last played as a  and  forward for the Featherstone Rovers in the Betfred Championship. He has previously played for the York City Knights.

Cuthbertson played for the Manly Warringah Sea Eagles, Cronulla-Sutherland Sharks, St. George Illawarra Dragons and the Newcastle Knights in the NRL, and the Leeds Rhinos in the Super League

Background
Cuthbertson was born in Manly, New South Wales, Australia.

Playing career

Manly-Warringah Sea Eagles

Born in Manly, New South Wales, Cuthbertson played his junior football for the Avalon Bulldogs and the Newport Breakers Rugby Union team before being signed by the Manly-Warringah Sea Eagles. He played for the Sea Eagles Premier League reserve-grade team in 2006.

In round 3 of the 2006 NRL season, Cuthbertson made his NRL debut for the Sea Eagles against the Cronulla-Sutherland Sharks.

In 2007, Cuthbertson was rewarded with a Man of the Match award for his performance against the Wests Tigers in round 16. Channel Nine commentator Phil Gould compared Cuthbertson's image to that of Manly legend Graham Eadie.

In 2007, Cuthbertson re-signed with the Sea Eagles on a 3-year contract. In 2007, Cuthbertson credited finding Christianity a year earlier as the catalyst for his rise from obscurity.

Cuthbertson played on the bench in the Sea Eagles' 2007 NRL Grand Final defeat by the Melbourne Storm.

In round 12 of the 2008 NRL season, Cuthbertson was sent off in a match against the Canberra Raiders for a high shot on Troy Thompson.
Cuthbertson made 21 appearances for Manly in 2008 but did not feature in the finals series or Manly's 40-0 grand final victory over Melbourne.

Cuthbertson played on the bench in the Sea Eagles' 2009 World Club Challenge win over the Leeds Rhinos, with the Sea Eagles winning 28-20.
In 2009, Cuthbertson was selected for the NSW City Origin team to play the NSW Country Origin side in the annual City vs Country Origin match. However, he did not play in the match after withdrawing due to injury.

Cronulla-Sutherland Sharks

On 18 June 2009, Cuthbertson signed a 2-year contract with the Cronulla-Sutherland Sharks starting in 2010.

Cuthbertson only played 12 games for the Sharks before being released from his contract.

St. George Illawarra Dragons
At the end of 2010, Cuthbertson was named in the Penrith Panthers 2011 pre-season squad but ended up signing a one-year contract with the St. George Illawarra Dragons starting in 2011 to try and revive his career under supercoach Wayne Bennett.

In 2011, Cuthbertson was again selected for City Origin, this time playing. Cuthbertson went on to play 19 games in 2011, scoring 2 tries for the Dragons.

Newcastle Knights
On 26 October 2011, Cuthbertson signed a 3-year contract with the Newcastle Knights starting in 2012.

Cuthbertson had a slow start to 2012 but finished the year having played 22 games in his first season for the Knights.

Leeds Rhinos
On 26 May 2014, Cuthbertson signed a four-year contract with the Leeds Rhinos starting in 2015. He made an impact in his first season at the Rhinos, helping the team to win the Challenge Cup in a 50-0 victory over Hull Kingston Rovers at Wembley Stadium.

Cuthbertson won the League Leaders' Shield after a last second victory over Huddersfield Giants. He set a new Super League record for offloads with 125.

Cuthbertson played in the 2015 Super League Grand Final victory over the Wigan Warriors at Old Trafford.

Cuthbertson played in the 2017 Super League Grand Final victory over the Castleford Tigers at Old Trafford.

On 17 October 2020, Cuthbertson played in the 2020 Challenge Cup Final victory for Leeds over Salford at Wembley Stadium.

York City Knights
On 27 September 2020 it was announced that Cuthbertson would join the York City Knights for the 2021 season.

Honours
Manly Warringah Sea Eagles
 World Club Challenge (1): 2009

Leeds Rhinos
 Super League (2): 2015, 2017
 League Leaders' Shield (1): 2015
 Challenge Cup (2): 2015, 2020

References

External links

Leeds Rhinos profile
Newcastle Knights profile
SL profile

1985 births
Living people
Australian people of English descent
Australian rugby league players
Australian expatriate sportspeople in England
Cronulla-Sutherland Sharks players
Featherstone Rovers players
Leeds Rhinos players
Manly Warringah Sea Eagles players
New South Wales City Origin rugby league team players
Newcastle Knights players
People from Manly, New South Wales
Rugby league locks
Rugby league players from Sydney
Rugby league props
Rugby league second-rows
St. George Illawarra Dragons players
Sunshine Coast Sea Eagles players
York City Knights players